The 2020–21 Utah Jazz season was the 47th season of the franchise in the National Basketball Association (NBA), and the 42nd season of the franchise in Salt Lake City.

The Utah Jazz clinched a playoff berth for the fifth straight year; they were the first team of the season to do so, following the Memphis Grizzlies' victory over the Portland Trail Blazers on April 25.

It was their first season finishing atop their conference since the 1997–98 season, and they had their highest win percentage since the 1998–99 season. Their 52–20 record approximately equals 59 wins in a full 82-game season. Additionally, despite the shortened season, it was their first season with 52 or more wins since the 2009–10 season.

In the first round, the Jazz defeated the Memphis Grizzlies in five games advancing to the Conference Semifinals where they faced the Los Angeles Clippers. The Jazz would lose in six games.

Draft picks

Roster

Standings

Division

Conference

Notes
 z – Clinched home court advantage for the entire playoffs
 c – Clinched home court advantage for the conference playoffs
 y – Clinched division title
 x – Clinched playoff spot
 pb – Clinched play-in spot
 o – Eliminated from playoff contention
 * – Division leader

Game log

Preseason 

|-style="background:#cfc;"
| 1
| December 12
| Phoenix
| 
| Jordan Clarkson (19)
| Rudy Gobert (8)
| Joe Ingles (7)
| Vivint ArenaNo In-Person Attendance
| 1–0
|-style="background:#cfc;"
| 2
| December 14
| Phoenix
| 
| Bojan Bogdanović (18)
| Rudy Gobert (20)
| 4 tied (3)
| Vivint ArenaNo In-Person Attendance
| 2–0
|-style="background:#cfc;"
| 3
| December 17
| @ L. A. Clippers
| 
| Bogdanović, Clarkson (20)
| Rudy Gobert (8)
| Donovan Mitchell (8)
| Staples CenterNo In-Person Attendance
| 3–0
|-

Regular season 

|-style="background:#cfc;"
| 1
| December 23
| @ Portland
| 
| Gobert, Mitchell (20)
| Rudy Gobert (17)
| Joe Ingles (7)
| Moda Center0
| 1–0
|-style="background:#fcc;"
| 2
| December 26
| Minnesota
| 
| Jordan Clarkson (23)
| Rudy Gobert (17)
| Donovan Mitchell (5)
| Vivint Arena0
| 1–1
|-style="background:#cfc;"
| 3
| December 28
| @ Oklahoma City
| 
| Bojan Bogdanović (23)
| Conley Jr., Gobert (10)
| Mike Conley Jr. (9)
| Chesapeake Energy Arena0
| 2–1
|-style="background:#fcc;"
| 4
| December 31
| Phoenix
| 
| Donovan Mitchell (23)
| Rudy Gobert (14)
| Conley Jr., Ingles (4)
| Vivint Arena1,932
| 2–2

|-style="background:#cfc;"
| 5
| January 1
| L. A. Clippers
| 
| Mike Conley Jr. (33)
| Derrick Favors (11)
| Conley Jr., Ingles (7)
| Vivint Arena1,932
| 3–2
|-style="background:#cfc;"
| 6
| January 3
| @ San Antonio
| 
| Bojan Bogdanović (28)
| Rudy Gobert (16)
| Donovan Mitchell (5)
| AT&T Center0
| 4–2
|-style="background:#fcc;"
| 7
| January 5
| @ Brooklyn
| 
| Donovan Mitchell (31)
| Rudy Gobert (11)
| Mike Conley Jr. (5)
| Barclays Center0
| 4–3
|-style="background:#fcc;"
| 8
| January 6
| @ New York
| 
| Jordan Clarkson (19)
| Rudy Gobert (11)
| Mike Conley Jr. (6)
| Madison Square Garden0
| 4–4
|-style="background:#cfc;"
| 9
| January 8
| @ Milwaukee
| 
| Donovan Mitchell (32)
| Rudy Gobert (14)
| Mike Conley Jr. (10)
| Fiserv Forum0
| 5–4
|-style="background:#cfc;"
| 10
| January 10
| @ Detroit
| 
| Donovan Mitchell (28)
| Rudy Gobert (19)
| Mike Conley Jr. (6)
| Little Caesars Arena0
| 6–4
|-style="background:#cfc;"
| 11
| January 12
| @ Cleveland
| 
| Donovan Mitchell (27)
| Rudy Gobert (10)
| Mike Conley Jr. (5)
| Rocket Mortgage FieldHouse1,944
| 7–4
|-style="background:#ccc;"
| –
| January 13
| @ Washington
| colspan="6" | Postponed (COVID-19) (Makeup date: March 18)
|-style="background:#cfc;"
| 12
| January 15
| Atlanta
| 
| Donovan Mitchell (26)
| Rudy Gobert (13)
| Mike Conley Jr. (8)
| Vivint Arena1,932
| 8–4
|-style="background:#cfc;"
| 13
| January 17
| @ Denver
| 
| Jordan Clarkson (23)
| Rudy Gobert (13)
| Mike Conley Jr. (8)
| Ball Arena0
| 9–4
|-style="background:#cfc;"
| 14
| January 19
| New Orleans
| 
| Donovan Mitchell (28)
| Rudy Gobert (18)
| Mike Conley Jr. (10)
| Vivint Arena1,932
| 10–4
|-style="background:#cfc;"
| 15
| January 21
| New Orleans
| 
| Donovan Mitchell (36)
| Rudy Gobert (11)
| Joe Ingles (9)
| Vivint Arena1,932
| 11–4
|-style="background:#cfc;"
| 16
| January 23
| Golden State
| 
| Donovan Mitchell (23)
| Rudy Gobert (14)
| Bojan Bogdanović (8)
| Vivint Arena1,932
| 12–4
|-style="background:#cfc;"
| 17
| January 26
| New York
| 
| Royce O'Neale (20)
| Rudy Gobert (19)
| Joe Ingles (6)
| Vivint Arena1,932
| 13–4
|-style="background:#cfc;"
| 18
| January 27
| Dallas
| 
| Rudy Gobert (29)
| Rudy Gobert (20)
| Joe Ingles (8)
| Vivint Arena1,932
| 14–4
|-style="background:#cfc;"
| 19
| January 29
| Dallas
| 
| Bojan Bogdanović (32)
| Rudy Gobert (12)
| Mike Conley Jr. (9)
| Vivint Arena1,932
| 15–4
|-style="background:#fcc;"
| 20
| January 31
| @ Denver
| 
| Bojan Bogdanović (29)
| Rudy Gobert (8)
| Mike Conley Jr. (8)
| Ball Arena0
| 15–5

|-style="background:#cfc;"
| 21
| February 2
| Detroit
| 
| Donovan Mitchell (32)
| Royce O'Neale (13)
| Joe Ingles (6)
| Vivint Arena3,902
| 16–5
|-style="background:#cfc;"
| 22
| February 4
| @ Atlanta
| 
| Jordan Clarkson (23)
| Rudy Gobert (12)
| Donovan Mitchell (5)
| State Farm Arena1,261
| 17–5
|-style="background:#cfc;"
| 23
| February 5
| @ Charlotte
| 
| Bojan Bogdanović (31)
| Rudy Gobert (15)
| Joe Ingles (11)
| Spectrum Center0
| 18–5
|-style="background:#cfc;"
| 24
| February 7
| @ Indiana
| 
| Donovan Mitchell (27)
| Rudy Gobert (16)
| Donovan Mitchell (11)
| Bankers Life Fieldhouse0
| 19–5
|-style="background:#cfc;"
| 25
| February 9
| Boston
| 
| Donovan Mitchell (36)
| Rudy Gobert (12)
| Donovan Mitchell (9)
| Vivint Arena3,902
| 20–5
|-style="background:#cfc;"
| 26
| February 12
| Milwaukee
| 
| Gobert, Ingles (27)
| Rudy Gobert (12)
| Donovan Mitchell (8)
| Vivint Arena3,902
| 21–5
|-style="background:#cfc;"
| 27
| February 13
| Miami
| 
| Donovan Mitchell (26)
| Rudy Gobert (12)
| Joe Ingles (6)
| Vivint Arena3,902
| 22–5
|-style="background:#cfc;"
| 28
| February 15
| Philadelphia
| 
| Jordan Clarkson (40)
| Rudy Gobert (9)
| Mitchell, Ingles (5)
| Vivint Arena3,902
| 23–5
|-style="background:#cfc;"
| 29
| February 17
| @ L. A. Clippers
| 
| Donovan Mitchell (24)
| Rudy Gobert (20)
| Donovan Mitchell (7)
| Staples Center0
| 24–5
|-style="background:#fcc;"
| 30
| February 19
| @ L. A. Clippers
| 
| Donovan Mitchell (35)
| Rudy Gobert (15)
| Donovan Mitchell (5)
| Staples Center0
| 24–6
|-style="background:#cfc;"
| 31
| February 22
| Charlotte
| 
| Donovan Mitchell (23)
| Rudy Gobert (12)
| Donovan Mitchell (8)
| Vivint Arena3,902
| 25–6
|-style="background:#cfc;"
| 32
| February 24
| L. A. Lakers
| 
| Gobert, Clarkson (18)
| Donovan Mitchell (10)
| Mitchell, Conley Jr. (8)
| Vivint Arena3,902
| 26–6
|-style="background:#fcc;"
| 33
| February 26
| @ Miami
| 
| Donovan Mitchell (30)
| Rudy Gobert (12)
| Mike Conley Jr. (7)
| American Airlines ArenaLimited seating
| 26–7
|-style="background:#cfc;"
| 34
| February 27
| @ Orlando
| 
| Donovan Mitchell (31)
| Rudy Gobert (16)
| Joe Ingles (7)
| Amway Center4,242
| 27–7

|-style="background:#fcc;"
| 35
| March 1
| @ New Orleans
| 
| Bojan Bogdanović (30)
| Rudy Gobert (9)
| Mitchell, Conley Jr. (8)
| Smoothie King Center2,700
| 27–8
|-style="background:#fcc;"
| 36
| March 3
| @ Philadelphia
| 
| Donovan Mitchell (33)
| Royce O'Neale (10)
| Donovan Mitchell (6)
| Wells Fargo Center0
| 27–9
|-style="background:#cfc;"
| 37
| March 12
| Houston
| 
| Donovan Mitchell (28)
| Rudy Gobert (11)
| Donovan Mitchell (8)
| Vivint Arena5,546
| 28–9
|-style="background:#fcc;"
| 38
| March 14
| @ Golden State
| 
| Gobert, Mitchell (24)
| Rudy Gobert (28)
| Joe Ingles (7)
| Chase Center0
| 28–10
|-style="background:#cfc;"
| 39
| March 16
| @ Boston
| 
| Donovan Mitchell (21)
| Rudy Gobert (12)
| Mitchell, Conley Jr. (5)
| TD Garden0
| 29–10
|-style="background:#fcc;"
| 40
| March 18
| @ Washington
| 
| Donovan Mitchell (42)
| Rudy Gobert (13)
| Clarkson, Mitchell (6)
| Capital One Arena0
| 29–11
|-style="background:#cfc;"
| 41
| March 19
| @ Toronto
| 
| Donovan Mitchell (31)
| Rudy Gobert (16)
| Ingles, Mitchell (6)
| Amalie ArenaLimited seating
| 30–11
|-style="background:#cfc;"
| 42
| March 22
| @ Chicago
| 
| Donovan Mitchell (30)
| Rudy Gobert (10)
| Donovan Mitchell (6)
| United Center0
| 31–11
|-style="background:#cfc;"
| 43
| March 24
| Brooklyn
| 
| Donovan Mitchell (27)
| Rudy Gobert (11)
| Donovan Mitchell (7)
| Vivint Arena5,546
| 32–11
|-style="background:#cfc;"
| 44
| March 26
| Memphis
| 
| Donovan Mitchell (35)
| Royce O'Neale (10)
| Mike Conley Jr. (8)
| Vivint Arena5,546
| 33–11
|-style="background:#cfc;"
| 45
| March 27
| Memphis
| 
| Donovan Mitchell (35)
| Rudy Gobert (14)
| Mitchell, Ingles (7)
| Vivint Arena5,546
| 34–11
|-style="background:#cfc;"
| 46
| March 29
| Cleveland
| 
| Donovan Mitchell (19)
| Rudy Gobert (17)
| Bogdanovic, Conley Jr. (5)
| Vivint Arena5,546
| 35–11
|-style="background:#cfc;"
| 47
| March 31
| @ Memphis
| 
| Mike Conley Jr. (26)
| Rudy Gobert (12)
| Mike Conley Jr. (7)
| FedExForum2,314
| 36–11

|-style="background:#cfc;"
| 48
| April 2
| Chicago
| 
| Donovan Mitchell (26)
| Rudy Gobert (13)
| Mitchell, Conley Jr. (5)
| Vivint Arena5,546
| 37–11
|-style="background:#cfc;"
| 49
| April 3
| Orlando
| 
| Donovan Mitchell (22)
| Favors, Gobert, Ingles (6)
| Jordan Clarkson (9)
| Vivint Arena5,546
| 38–11
|-style="background:#fcc;"
| 50
| April 5
| @ Dallas
| 
| Mike Conley Jr. (28)
| Rudy Gobert (15)
| Mike Conley Jr. (7)
| American Airlines Center4,261
| 38–12
|-style="background:#fcc;"
| 51
| April 7
| @ Phoenix
| 
| Donovan Mitchell (41)
| Rudy Gobert (15)
| Mike Conley Jr. (10)
| Phoenix Suns Arena5,110
| 38–13
|-style="background:#cfc;"
| 52
| April 8
| Portland
| 
| Donovan Mitchell (37)
| Rudy Gobert (20)
| Joe Ingles (6)
| Vivint Arena5,546
| 39–13
|-style="background:#cfc;"
| 53
| April 10
| Sacramento
| 
| Donovan Mitchell (42)
| Royce O'Neale (14)
| Joe Ingles (6)
| Vivint Arena5,546
| 40–13
|-style="background:#fcc;"
| 54
| April 12
| Washington
| 
| Donovan Mitchell (42)
| O'Neale, Gobert (12)
| Ingles, Mitchell (6)
| Vivint Arena5,546
| 40–14
|-style="background:#cfc;"
| 55
| April 13
| Oklahoma City
| 
| Bojan Bogdanović (23)
| Rudy Gobert (14)
| Mike Conley Jr. (14)
| Vivint Arena5,546
| 41–14
|-style="background:#cfc;"
| 56
| April 16
| Indiana
| 
| Bojan Bogdanović (24)
| Rudy Gobert (23)
| Mike Conley Jr. (10)
| Vivint Arena5,546
| 42–14
|-style="background:#fcc;"
| 57
| April 17
| @ L. A. Lakers
| 
| Jordan Clarkson (27)
| Royce O'Neale (8)
| Joe Ingles (14)
| Staples Center1,710
| 42–15
|-style="background:#cfc;"
| 58
| April 19
| @ L. A. Lakers
| 
| Jordan Clarkson (22)
| Rudy Gobert (10)
| Mike Conley Jr. (10)
| Staples Center1,710
| 43–15
|-style="background:#cfc;"
| 59
| April 21
| @ Houston
| 
| Jordan Clarkson (22)
| Rudy Gobert (18)
| Mike Conley Jr. (13)
| Toyota Center3,253
| 44–15
|-style="background:#fcc;"
| 60
| April 24
| Minnesota
| 
| Bojan Bogdanović (30)
| Rudy Gobert (17)
| Ingles, Conley Jr. (7)
| Vivint Arena5,546
| 44–16
|-style="background:#fcc;"
| 61
| April 26
| @ Minnesota
| 
| Mike Conley Jr. (26)
| Royce O'Neale (10)
| Derrick Favors (8)
| Target Center1,638
| 44–17
|-style="background:#cfc;"
| 62
| April 28
| @ Sacramento
| 
| Bojan Bogdanović (24)
| Derrick Favors (11)
| Joe Ingles (7)
| Golden 1 Center0
| 45–17
|-style="background:#fcc;"
| 63
| April 30
| @ Phoenix
| 
| Bojan Bogdanović (22)
| Rudy Gobert (10)
| Clarkson, Ingles (4)
| Phoenix Suns Arena6,065
| 45–18

|-style="background:#cfc;"
| 64
| May 1
| Toronto
| 
| Bojan Bogdanović (34)
| Rudy Gobert (16)
| Joe Ingles (9)
| Vivint Arena6,506
| 46–18
|-style="background:#cfc;"
| 65
| May 3
| San Antonio
| 
| Bojan Bogdanović (25)
| Rudy Gobert (15)
| Joe Ingles (9)
| Vivint Arena6,506
| 47–18
|-style="background:#cfc;"
| 66
| May 5
| San Antonio
| 
| Jordan Clarkson (30)
| Rudy Gobert (8)
| Joe Ingles (7)
| Vivint Arena6,506
| 48–18
|-style="background:#cfc;"
| 67
| May 7
| Denver
| 
| Bojan Bogdanović (48)
| Rudy Gobert (9)
| Joe Ingles (9)
| Vivint Arena6,506
| 49–18
|-style="background:#cfc;"
| 68
| May 8
| Houston
| 
| Georges Niang (24)
| Rudy Gobert (14)
| Joe Ingles (7)
| Vivint Arena6,506
| 50–18
|-style="background:#fcc;"
| 69
| May 10
| @ Golden State
| 
| Jordan Clarkson (41)
| Rudy Gobert (15)
| Joe Ingles (5)
| Chase Center4,155
| 50–19
|-style="background:#fcc;"
| 70
| May 12
| Portland
| 
| Jordan Clarkson (29)
| Rudy Gobert (20)
| Joe Ingles (4)
| Vivint Arena6,506
| 50–20
|-style="background:#cfc;"
| 71
| May 14
| @ Oklahoma City
| 
| Bojan Bogdanovic (22)
| Rudy Gobert (18)
| Joe Ingles (5)
| Chesapeake Energy Arena0
| 51–20
|-style="background:#cfc;"
| 72
| May 16
| @ Sacramento
| 
| Jordan Clarkson (33)
| Rudy Gobert (16)
| Mike Conley Jr. (9)
| Golden 1 Center0
| 52–20

Playoffs 

|-style="background:#fcc;"
| 1
| May 23
| Memphis
| 
| Bojan Bogdanović (29)
| Rudy Gobert (15)
| Mike Conley Jr. (11)
| Vivint Arena13,750
| 0–1
|-style="background:#cfc;"
| 2
| May 26
| Memphis
| 
| Donovan Mitchell (25)
| Rudy Gobert (13)
| Mike Conley Jr. (15)
| Vivint Arena14,200
| 1–1
|-style="background:#cfc;"
| 3
| May 29
| @ Memphis
| 
| Donovan Mitchell (29)
| Rudy Gobert (14)
| Mike Conley Jr. (8)
| FedExForum12,185
| 2–1
|-style="background:#cfc;"
| 4
| May 31
| @ Memphis
| 
| Donovan Mitchell (30)
| Royce O'Neale (9)
| Donovan Mitchell (8)
| FedExForum12,185
| 3–1
|-style="background:#cfc;"
| 5
| June 2
| Memphis
| 
| Donovan Mitchell (30)
| Rudy Gobert (15)
| Donovan Mitchell (10)
| Vivint Arena14,250
| 4–1

|-style="background:#cfc;"
| 1
| June 8
| L. A. Clippers
| 
| Donovan Mitchell (45)
| Rudy Gobert (12)
| Joe Ingles (7)
| Vivint Arena18,007
| 1–0
|-style="background:#cfc;"
| 2
| June 10
| L. A. Clippers
| 
| Donovan Mitchell (37)
| Rudy Gobert (20)
| Ingles, Mitchell (4)
| Vivint Arena18,007
| 2–0
|-style="background:#fcc;"
| 3
| June 12
| @ L. A. Clippers
| 
| Donovan Mitchell (30)
| Rudy Gobert (10)
| Donovan Mitchell (4)
| Staples Center8,185
| 2–1
|-style="background:#fcc;"
| 4
| June 14
| @ L. A. Clippers
| 
| Donovan Mitchell (37)
| Gobert, O'Neale
(8)
| Bogdanović, Mitchell (5)
| Staples Center8,474
| 2–2
|-style="background:#fcc;"
| 5
| June 16
| L. A. Clippers
| 
| Bojan Bogdanović (32)
| Rudy Gobert (10)
| Joe Ingles (6)
| Vivint Arena18,007
| 2–3
|-style="background:#fcc;"
| 6
| June 18
| @ L. A. Clippers
| 
| Donovan Mitchell (39)
| Gobert, O'Neale (10)
| Donovan Mitchell (9) 
| Staples Center17,105
| 2–4
|-style="background:#;"

Transactions

Trades

Free agency

Re-signed

Additions

Awards

References

Utah Jazz seasons
Utah
Utah Jazz
Utah Jazz